This is a list of Italian television related events from 1992

Events 

 26 February: during the opening evening of the Sanremo festival, hosted by Pippo Baudo, Crazy Horse (alias Mario Appignani), infamous serial jammer of public events, takes the stage crying “The festival is rigged and Fausto Leali will win it!”, before being moved away by the staff. The prediction doesn't come true: the winner is Luca Barbarossa with Portami a ballare, while Leali gets only the 9th place.
 March 3: two weeks after the arrest of Mario Chiesa, Bettino Craxi is guest at TG3. The socialist leader, answering to a viewer’s question, calls Chiesa “a scoundrel who casts a shadow on a party that in Milan … in fifty years never had an administrator sentenced for serious crimes.” Instead, the Mani Pulite enquiry, originated by the Chiesa affair, in the following months spreads like wildfire, overwhelming the whole Italian political system.   
 23 May: at 10 PM, in an interlude of the variety show Scommettiamo che..., an extraordinary edition of TG1 announces the death of Giovanni Falcone in the Capaci bombing . Despite the tragic event, RAI chooses to continue the show, against the will of the same host Fabrizio Frizzi (son-in-law of another Mafia victim, Carlo Alberto dalla Chiesa).
25 May, RAI airs from Palermo the burials of the victim; the tears of Rosaria Schifani, widow of a police escort, upset Italy. Paolo Borsellino declares to the TV journalist David Sassoli: "When I picked up Giovanni Falcone's last breaths in my arms, I thought it was just a postponed appointment"; On 19 July, Borsellino is in turn killed in the Via D’Amelio bombing.

Debuts

Rai

Serials 

 Cinico TV – by Ciprì & Maresco, series of black-and-white shorts, hosted in various other programs; 4 seasons. The series, set in the Palermo suburbia and with freakish characters, is inspired, as the future films of the two authors, by a dark and upsetting humour.

News and educational 

 Milano, Italia – political talk show, broadcast from Milan and hosted initially by Gad Lerner, 2 seasons; it's now a precious document about the season of Mani Pulite and the Mafia bombings.

Fininvest

Serials 

 Gommapiuma (Foam rubber) – satirical comedy with puppets, Italian version of the English Splitting Image ; 3 seasons.

Variety 

 Karaoke – karaoke contest from the squares of various Italian towns, hosted by Beppe Fiorello and later by his brother Giuseppe; 3 seasons more a restart in 2015.
 La sai l’ultima? (Do you know the latest story?) – contest of joke tellers, with various hosts (Jerry Scotti and Natalia Estrada the most active); 11 seasons and 6 spin-offs.
 Scherzi a parte (All kiddings aside) – candid camera show, with various hosts (Teo Teocoli the most active) and known personalities as the victims of the jokes; 14 seasons and 8 spin-offs or special editions.

Shows of the year

Rai

Miniseries 

 La piovra 6 – L’ultimo segreto (The last secret) – by Luigi Perelli, with Vittorio Mezzogiorno, Patricia Millardet and Remo Girone; 6 episodes. The new hero of the franchise, Davide Licata, dies too for the consequences of a mafia attack, while the villain Tano Cariddi becomes a “pentito”.

Music 
 Tosca, nei luoghi e nelle ore di Tosca (Tosca, in her places and hours) – by Giuseppe Patroni-Griffi, with Catherine Malfitano, Placido Domingo and Ruggero Raimondi; the Puccini’s opera is broadcast live from the real places of the story in Rome; first chapter of the series La via della musica (The music way).

Variety 

 Su la testa! (Up your head!) – satirical show broadcast from the Baggio tent-theatre. The host Paolo Rossi (at his TV debut) is sided by several stand-up comedians coming from the Zelig cabaret, as Aldo, Giovanni e Giacomo.

Fininvest

Drama 
Fantaghirò 2 – sequel in 2 parts of Fantaghirò by Lamberto Bava, with Alessandra Martines and Kim Rossi Stuart; debut in the series of Brigitte Nielsen as the Black Witch, who will become the Fantaghirò’s recurring adversary.

References 

1992 in Italian television